Brian Bennett (born 1940) is a British musician, best known as drummer with The Shadows.

Brian or Bryan Bennett may also refer to:
Brian Bennett (footballer) (born 1938), Australian rules footballer
Brian Bennett (diplomat) (born 1948), British diplomat
Bryan Bennett (born 1992), American football player